is a Japanese tokusatsu TV series, part of the Metal Hero Series franchise and the first piece of the Rescue Police Series trilogy. The series follows the adventures and missions of a special "Rescue Police" team known as Special Police Winspector, as they stop crimes and respond to dangerous events where regular police force is not sufficient. The team is made up of one human (a hero clad in armor) and two robotic assistants.

Story
Special Rescue Police Winspector takes place in a near-future Japan of the year 1999. As the country is facing a great threat from criminals, new methods of protecting people are created. The Winspector squad, consisting of the robot brothers Walter and Bikel, along with Ryouma (wearing the Fire Tector armor), defend against super powered threats, ranging from mob attacks to scientific experiments gone terribly wrong.

Team
: 23 years old. Ryoma is the leader of the team and the only human member. Like Masaki, he is also a Police Superintendent. Kagawa is an orphan skilled in martial arts and knows five languages. His primary means of transportation is a purpose-built car named Winsquad. When initiating his transformation to Fire he calls out . There are also other, more specialized weapons and tools available. Ryoma has a sister. He later joined the Solbrain team as Knight Fire.
: Walter's "twin brother", Bichael is one of two robots who assist Ryouma. His primary means of transportation is his motorcycle. However he also has a wheel integrated into his chest section which he can use to "land-surf" when no vehicle is available. His weaponry consists of twin lances, which can be combined into a longer staff and can alternatively function as the handles of his motorcycle or coin bombs. Bikel's armor is yellow. Being a master of jokes and sometimes a little inane, he's often subject to Walter's anger. He speaks in a Nagoya dialect.
: Bichael's "twin brother", Walter is the other of the two robots in the team. Being equipped with wings enables him to fly, thus requiring no special vehicle. His armor is turquoise. Walter loves children and he is generally the type of "person" who enjoys life.
: Shunsuke is Winspector's commander and founder. He usually remains in the headquarters of Winspector, but if necessary, for example when a member falls into a pinch, he goes to the site himself and takes command. After the series, he established another rescue team called Solbrain and made a comeback in the last few episodes of Exceedraft.
: Junko is an information G-man. She is an expert with handguns.
: Hisako is a secret G-man. She usually works in a coffee shop. Her father, was a colleague of Masaki until he was killed in action six years ago.
: Shin'ichi is Winspector's mechanic. He develops rescue tools and maintains Bikel and Walter. Likes playing chess
: Madocks is Winspector's supercomputer. Madocks holds data on every criminal and can analyze it in an instant.
: Demitasse is a small robot. His main work is to repair Bichael and Walter during emergencies, as well as secret investigation activity.

Arsenal
: The team's strongest weapon, first used in episode 31 to defeat a robot cop named Brian, who was created by the same system as Bichael and Walter, but was reprogrammed to be a killing machine. GigaStreamer has two modes depending on which of two tops (drill or plasma minigun) is put onto it. Its strongest attack is a plasma minigun blast called Maxime Mode which needs Fire to insert his MaxCalibur to the gun. Later Daiki (SolBraver) used it to defeat a chameleon-robot. 
: A sword-like gauntlet weapon belonging to Fire, it also shoots lasers. 
: Bichael's two sticks, which can be combined to form a long rod and are used as the handlebars of WinChaser. 
: Walter's wings, which can transform into a shield. They let him fly, sometimes while carrying Bichael.
: A box with water-shooters and first aid equipment. Used by Fire, Bichael and Walter. 
: a laser handgun which can double as a welder. Every member of the team has one and stores it in a holster on the right leg. 
: Cuffs. 
: Ryoma's police license. Becomes white, when he wears the Crush Tector.
: A Suzuki TS200 and Bichael's bike, who received it in episode 15.
: Ryoma's car and transformation device. It's a version of a Chevrolet Camaro colored white. Since ep. 15 when Ryoma puts the blue-colored , the WinSquad transforms to a red . 
 Masaki's undercover car: Chief Masaki's car in undercover operations. A White (brown in some episodes) Mazda Luce HC. 
 Junko's undercover car: Junko's car in undercover operations. A red Mazda RX-7 FC, similar to KnightFire's Knight Custom in the sequel series Tokkyuu Shirei Solbrain.

Episodes
 : written by Noboru Sugimura, directed by Shohei Tojo
 : written by Noboru Sugimura, directed by Shohei Tojo
 : written by Junichi Miyashita, directed by Takeshi Ogasawara
 : written by Junichi Miyashita, directed by Takeshi Ogasawara
 : written by Susumu Takaku, directed by Kaneharu Mitsumura
 : written by Nobuo Ogizawa, directed by Kaneharu Mitsumura
 : written by Kunio Fujii, directed by Shohei Tojo
 : written by Nobuo Ogizawa, directed by Shohei Tojo
 : written by Susumu Takaku, directed by Michio Konishi
 : written by Noboru Sugimura, directed by Michio Konishi
 : written by Junichi Miyashita, directed by Takeshi Ogasawara
 : written by Kyoko Sagiyama, directed by Takeshi Ogasawara
 : written by Susumu Takaku, directed by Kaneharu Mitsumura
 : written by Susumu Takaku, directed by Kaneharu Mitsumura
 : written by Junichi Miyashita, directed by Michio Konishi
 : written by Noboru Sugimura, directed by Michio Konishi
 : written by Noboru Sugimura, directed by Takeshi Ogasawara
 : written by Kyoko Sagiyama, directed by Takeshi Ogasawara
 : written by Junichi Miyashita, directed by Kaneharu Mitsumura
 : written by Nobuo Ogizawa, directed by Kaneharu Mitsumura
 : written by Takashi Yamada, directed by Michio Konishi
 : written by Noboru Sugimura, directed by Michio Konishi
 : written by Kyoko Sagiyama, directed by Takeshi Ogasawara
 : written by Susumu Takaku, directed by Takeshi Ogasawara
 : written by Nobuo Ogizawa, directed by Kaneharu Mitsumura
 : written by Takashi Yamada, directed by Kaneharu Mitsumura
 : written by Kyoko Sagiyama, directed by Michio Konishi
 : written by Noboru Sugimura, directed by Michio Konishi
 : written by Susumu Takaku, directed by Takeshi Ogasawara
 : written by Kenichi Araki, directed by Takeshi Ogasawara
 : written by Noboru Sugimura, directed by Kaneharu Mitsumura
 : written by Noboru Sugimura, directed by Kaneharu Mitsumura
 : written by Nobuo Ogizawa, directed by Kiyoshi Arai
 : written by Takashi Yamada, directed by Kiyoshi Arai
 : written by Junichi Miyashita, directed by Takeshi Ogasawara
 : written by Kyoko Sagiyama, directed by Takeshi Ogasawara
 : written by Takahiko Masuda, directed by Kaneharu Mitsumura
 : written by Nobuo Ogizawa, directed by Kaneharu Mitsumura
 : written by Yoshichika Shindo, directed by Kiyoshi Arai
 : written by Noboru Sugimura, directed by Michio Konishi
 : written by Noboru Sugimura, directed by Michio Konishi
 : written by Susumu Takaku, directed by Takeshi Ogasawara
 : written by Junichi Miyashita, directed by Takeshi Ogasawara
 : written by Nobuo Ogizawa, directed by Kiyoshi Arai
 : written by Takashi Yamada, directed by Kiyoshi Arai
 : written by Nobuo Ogizawa, directed by Michio Konishi
 : written by Kyoko Sagiyama, directed by Michio Konishi
 : written by Noboru Sugimura, directed by Takeshi Ogasawara
 : written by Noboru Sugimura, directed by Takeshi Ogasawara

Cast
 - 
 - 
 - 
 -  
 -  
 - 
 - 
 - 
 - 
 - 
 - 
 - 
 -

Songs
Opening theme

Lyrics: 
Composition: 
Arrangement: 
Artist: 
Ending theme

Lyrics: Keisuke Yamakawa
Composition: Kisaburō Suzuki
Arrangement: Tatsumi Yano
Artist: Takayuki Miyauchi

International Broadcasts
Special Police Rescue Winspector released in the Philippines aired on IBC from 1993 to 1994 as (Tagalog version) (In Filipino names (Ryoma Kagawa) Gabriel and (Junko Fujino) Carina) the sequel of The Mobile Cop Jiban.
The series in France on TF1. Its popularity led to the airings of subsequent Metal Hero shows such as Space Sheriff Sharivan, Space Sheriff Shaider, and The Mobile Cop Jiban. The opening of the show was sung by Bernard Minet. 
It was also shown in Germany on RTL in 1992-1993 (and a second time in 1994–1995). This was the only series in the Metal Heroes series that aired in the region.
It was shown in Italy on Italia 7 in 1992. It was the only series in the Metal Heroes series that was aired in the region and it was broadcast fully uncut and unedited in its original form.
In Spain, the series aired on TVE1 around the same time as Jiban.
Indonesia and Malaysia also Broadcast the series on Indosiar and TV3.
In Brazil the series was very popular in the 1990s, along with several seasons of the Metal Heroes franchise.  
It also aired in Thailand on TV7 in the mid-1990s.

External links
 

Fictional police officers
Television series set in 1999
Japanese science fiction television series
Metal Hero Series
1990 Japanese television series debuts
1991 Japanese television series endings
TV Asahi original programming